Enid is an unincorporated community located in Tallahatchie County, Mississippi, United States.

Although Enid is an unincorporated community, it has a post office and a zip code of 38927.

References

Unincorporated communities in Tallahatchie County, Mississippi
Unincorporated communities in Mississippi